Khilchipur tehsil is a tehsil in Rajgarh district,Madhya Pradesh, India. It is also a subdivision of the administrative and revenue division of bhopal district of Madhya Pradesh.

Demographics

References 

Tehsils of Madhya Pradesh
Rajgarh district